The 1906–07 season was Blackpool F.C.'s tenth season (seventh consecutive) in the Football League. They competed in the twenty-team Division Two, then the second tier of English football, finishing thirteenth.

William Grundy was the club's top scorer, with eight goals.

Season synopsis
It took nine games for the Seasiders to chalk up their first victory. It occurred on 20 October at home to Glossop Town. Only three more wins were procured before the end of the year.

Of the eighteen fixtures that took place in 1907, Blackpool won seven, drew six and lost five.

Blackpool's FA Cup campaign ended where it started: at West Ham United in the First Round.

Table

Player statistics

Appearances

League
Tom Wilcox – 37
 Jack Scott – 34
Edward Threlfall – 36
T. Clarke – 34
Jack Parkinson – 31
Bob Crewdson – 29
J. Gow – 26
E. Francis – 23
Andrew Swan – 19
William Anderton – 18
Jack Morris – 17
Levi Copestake – 17
William Grundy – 16
J. Lavery – 16
Albert Dunkley – 15
Jimmy Connor – 13
Sam Johnson – 9
Hugh Rimmer – 7
Bob Birkett – 4
T. Bate – 4
Alf Pearson – 4
Bert Wake – 3
J. Collier – 2
W. Lowe – 2
Herbert Crossthwaite – 1
Players used: 25

FA Cup
T. Clarke – 1
Jimmy Connor – 1
Bob Crewdson – 1
Albert Dunkley – 1
E. Francis – 1
J. Gow – 1
William Grundy – 1
Jack Parkinson – 1
 Jack Scott – 1
Edward Threlfall – 1
Tom Wilcox – 1

Players used: 11

Goals

League
William Grundy – 8
E. Francis – 5
Jimmy Connor – 4
Jack Morris – 4
Albert Dunkley – 3
Edward Threlfall – 3
William Anderton – 2
 Jack Scott – 2
Levi Copestake – 1

League goals scored: 32 (plus one own-goal)

FA Cup
Jack Parkinson – 1

FA Cup goals scored: 1

Transfers

In

Out
The following players left after the final game of the previous season:

Notes

References

Blackpool F.C.
Blackpool F.C. seasons